Kazi Masum Akhtar (born 1971) is an educationist from West Bengal, India. In 2020, he was conferred the Padma Shri India's fourth highest civilian award by the Government of India for his contribution to the field of literature. He is the headmaster in the Talpukur Ara High Madarsa near Kolkata, West Bengal. He was beaten up by radical Muslim clerics for asking students of his Madarsa to sing the Indian National anthem on Indian Republic Day .

References 

Living people
1971 births
Educators from West Bengal
Recipients of the Padma Shri in literature & education